OutInPerth is an online LGBT publication in Perth, Western Australia. The website covers local, national, and international LGBT news. The editors are Graeme Watson and Leigh Hill.

It can no longer be found in over 300 bars, shops and any locations across Western Australia, and it can only be read online.
It closed briefly in April 2016 when its owners went into liquidation. It resumed after its editors bought the rights and conducted a fundraising campaign. Print publication ended for the magazine in February 2019.

References

External links

LGBT-related newspapers published in Australia
Newspapers published in Perth, Western Australia